Nigel Ashurst is a former association football player who represented New Zealand at international level.

Ashurst played three official full internationals for New Zealand, making his debut in a 3–1 win over New Caledonia on 30 September 1972. His other two matches were a 1–3 loss to Australia on 9 September and a 1–1 draw with Indonesia on 10 October 1972.

References 

Year of birth missing (living people)
Living people
New Zealand association footballers
New Zealand international footballers
Association football midfielders